Disabled skiing was a demonstration sport at the 1988 Winter Olympics. Contrary to the Paralympics, these events were demonstrations held during the Olympics.

Placement table

Men's event

Modified Giant slalom for above-the-Knee Amputees 
February 21, 1988

Cross country, 5 km (for blinds) 
February 17, 1988

Women's event

Modified Giant slalom for above-the-Knee Amputees 
February 21, 1988

Cross country, 5 km (for blinds) 

February 17, 1988

References 
 Olympic Review - March 1988

1988 Winter Olympics events
Olympic demonstration sports
Men's events at the 1988 Winter Olympics
Women's events at the 1988 Winter Olympics